Van Buren is a town on the Saint John River in Aroostook County, Maine, United States; located across from Saint-Leonard, New Brunswick, Canada. The population was 2,038 at the 2020 census. It is named after U.S. President Martin Van Buren.

Geography

Van Buren is connected to Saint Leonard, New Brunswick, via the Saint Leonard-Van Buren Bridge.

Climate

This climatic region is typified by large seasonal temperature differences, with warm to hot (and often humid) summers and cold (sometimes severely cold) winters.  According to the Köppen Climate Classification system, Van Buren has a humid continental climate, abbreviated "Dfb" on climate maps.

Schools
Van Buren is part of the Maine School Administrative District No. 24 school system, which contains Van Buren District Elementary School and Van Buren District Secondary School.

Demographics

Van Buren is part of Francophone North America; 76.6 percent of residents are habitual speakers of French. Links with Québec and New Brunswick are consequently strong.

2010 census
As of the census of 2010, there were 2,171 people, 1,027 households, and 601 families living in the town. The racial makeup of the town was 96.9% White, 0.3% African American, 0.4% Native American, 0.1% Asian, 0.3% from other races, and 2.1% from two or more races. Hispanic or Latino of any race were 0.6% of the population.

There were 1,027 households, of which 20.5% had children under the age of 18 living with them, 43.1% were married couples living together, 11.2% had a female householder with no husband present, 4.2% had a male householder with no wife present, and 41.5% were non-families. 36.7% of all households were made up of individuals, and 17.2% had someone living alone who was 65 years of age or older. The average household size was 2.06 and the average family size was 2.55.

The median age in the town was 51.5 years. 15.9% of residents were under the age of 18; 6% were between the ages of 18 and 24; 18.2% were from 25 to 44; 35.1% were from 45 to 64; and 24.7% were 65 years of age or older. The gender makeup of the town was 48.5% male and 51.5% female.

2000 census

As of the census of 2000, there were 2,631 people, 1,095 households, and 704 families living in the town. The racial makeup of the town was 98.59% White, 0.11% Black or African American, 0.30% Native American, 0.15% Asian, 0.04% from other races, and 0.80% from two or more races. Hispanic or Latino of any race were 0.72% of the population.

There were 1,095 households, out of which 25.9% had children under the age of 18 living with them, 50.6% were married couples living together, 9.0% had a female householder with no husband present, and 35.7% were non-families. 31.5% of all households were made up of individuals, and 14.9% had someone living alone who was 65 years of age or older.  The average household size was 2.22 and the average family size was 2.73.

In the town, the population was spread out, with 19.8% under the age of 18, 5.3% from 18 to 24, 24.5% from 25 to 44, 28.3% from 45 to 64, and 22.1% who were 65 years of age or older.  The median age was 45 years. For every 100 females, there were 87.9 males.  For every 100 females age 18 and over, there were 85.7 males.

The median income for a household in the town was $20,038, and the median income for a family was $29,458. Males had a median income of $27,411 versus $19,583 for females. The per capita income for the town was $12,651.  About 15.2% of families and 22.1% of the population were below the poverty line, including 25.9% of those under age 18 and 14.5% of those age 65 or over.

References

External links
Town of Van Buren

 
French-American culture in Maine
Towns in Aroostook County, Maine
Populated places on the Saint John River (Bay of Fundy)